Do It For Johnny is a 2007 documentary film developed by Haylar Garcia and Scott Baxendale, and directed by Garcia about how a group of indie filmmakers try to get Johnny Depp to support their unknown and unfunded screenplay "Narcophonic".

Development
In 2002, Colorado filmmakers/musicians Haylar Garcia and Scott Baxendale began work on a screenplay called "Narcophonic", which takes place over a 30-year period in Rock & Roll history, and chronicles the true-life events of Scott Baxendale's life as a guitar maker. Baxendale and Garcia began the search for an actor to play the film's lead, eventually settling on Johnny Depp. As the fourth draft of the script became finalized in late 2004, Garcia and Baxendale decided to show Depp Baxendale's craftmanship by giving the actor one of his guitars. Over the course of the next few months, Baxendale built a custom design, solid-body electric guitar for Depp. In the rear of the instrument he built a special chamber, meant to house and display the film script. But then arose another problem—how to deliver the guitar to Depp.

Synopsis
With the help of their indie production team and Johnny Depp fans around the world, Garcia and Baxendale chronicle their quest to hand deliver the guitar and script to Johnny Depp, all the while filming their journey.

Cast
 Haylar Garcia as himself
 Scott Baxendale as himself
 Darcy Grabowski as herself
 Jeff Deel as himself
 Damon Scott as himself

Production
Portions of this documentary were filmed in Denver, Colorado, Dallas, Texas, and Los Angeles, California.

Reception
When the film debuted at the Santa Barbara International Film Festival, Variety referred to it as a "notable premiere".

Awards and nominations
The film won "best documentary" at the 2007 Rainier Independent Film Festival.

References

External links
 {{official website|https://web.archive.org/web/20120723004549/http://s90252143.onlinehome.us/%7D%7D, Wayback Machine snapshot June 1, 2013 
 

2007 films
American documentary films
2007 documentary films
Documentary films about the cinema of the United States
2000s English-language films
2000s American films